Khazar Guran may refer to:
 Khazar Guran-e Olya